Ernst Anders (26 March 1845, Magdeburg – 1911, Mölln) was a German painter. 

He began his artistic education as a private student of Andreas Müller then, in 1863, enrolled at the Kunstakademie Düsseldorf, where he studied with  Rudolf Wiegmann, Heinrich Mücke, Karl Ferdinand Sohn and Julius Roeting. From 1868 to 1872, he was a private student of Wilhelm Sohn. Most of his paintings were genre scenes, but he made his living doing portraits, including  many of his fellow artists.

References

Ernst Anders (Maler). In: Thieme-Becker, Allgemeines Lexikon der Bildenden Künstler von der Antike bis zur Gegenwart, Vol.1, Wilhelm Engelmann, Leipzig 1907, pg.300

1845 births
1911 deaths
19th-century German painters
19th-century German male artists
German male painters
20th-century German painters
20th-century German male artists
German portrait painters